The Prussian Class T 3 steam locomotives procured for the Prussian state railways were 0-6-0 tank locomotives. Together with the Prussian T 2 they were the first locomotives that were built to railway norms. The first units were delivered by Henschel in 1882.

Design 
The T 3s had a wet steam engine with two cylinders that drove the centre coupled axle. The slide valves were worked by an outside Allan valve gear. The water supply was stored in a well tank between the frame under the boiler; the coal bunkers were on the left and right hand side of the firebox. In front of each one was a filler pipe for the water tank.

The springs on both front axles were linked with equalising beams located above the running plate. 

The early T 3s did not have a steam dome, but were equipped with a regulator housing on top, from which the admission pipes led directly to the cylinders outside the boiler. The axle load of this locomotive was about 10 t (see first photo).

Later batches (from 1887) had a steam dome, and the admission pipes were located in the smokebox. Due to the addition of the steam dome, the location of the sand box and sanders were changed. In addition the quantities of water and coal that could be carried were increased. The back wall of the cab was now straight and the lower section no longer sloped. The length over buffers increased from 8,300 mm to 8,591 mm, the axle load rose to 11 t (see second photo).

From 1903 the supplies were increased again and the T 3 could now carry 5 m3 of water and 1.9 t of coal. The axle load of this "strengthened standard class" or "Standard class (6t)" (Normalbauart (6t)) was 12 t.

T 3s for other railways 
A total of more than 1,300 T 3s were built for the Prussian state railways. But many other railways in Germany and abroad, from industrial railways to national railways, also bought locomotives based on the T 3 pattern, including the:
 Grand Duchy of Mecklenburg Friedrich-Franz Railway (see Mecklenburg T 3)
 Grand Duchy of Oldenburg State Railways (see Oldenburg T 3)
 Brunswick State Railway (BLE)
 Oldenburg County Railway (Kreis Oldenburger Eisenbahn or KOE)
 Zschipkau-Finsterwald Railway (ZFE)
 Società Veneta, Italy

DRG numbering 

In 1925 the Deutsche Reichsbahn (DRG) took over 511 Prussian T 3s as their Class 89.70–75. The 473 locomotives of the older version were given numbers 89 7001–7456, 7473–7476 and 7499–7511. The 38 locomotives of the stronger design were given numbers 89 7457–7472 and 89 7477–7498. 

In incorporating locomotives later on from private railways that they had taken over, the DRG were not very logical. As a result, Class 89.75 ended up with a mixture of various locomotives types, in some cases with numbers that followed directly on from one another. 

 The locomotives whose numbers immediately followed the Prussian T3s, those with numbers 89 7512–7521, were not T 3s, but an industrial locomotive (Class Pudel which translates as "poodle") built by Jung for the former Bremen Harbour Railway 10–19 that had been taken over by the DRG in 1930. These engines had a 15 t coupled axle load and were significantly heavier than the T 3. They had a Walschaerts valve gear and a small coal bunker behind the cab. 
 The T 3s of the BLE, taken over in 1938 by the DRG, were given numbers 89 7531–7540. Locomotive 89 7535 was transferred that same year to the Gardelegen-Neuhaldensleben-Weferlingen railway. 
 Locomotive 89 7541, which also came from the BLE, only resembled the T 3 in terms of its frame and running gear. The dimensions of cylinders, grate and heating areas were different.
 The three T 3s from the KOE, which was taken over by the DRG in 1941, were given numbers 89 7556, 89 7557 and 89 7559. No. 89 7558 was no T 3, but a somewhat more powerful class, the Bismarck class industrial locomotive built by Henschel.
 The T 3 from the ZFE, taken over in 1943, was retired at the same time. The locomotives with numbers 89 7560–89 7564 were from a different class, that had a 12 t coupled axle load, but were no more powerful than the T 3.

After the Second World War 
 
By the start of 1931 the DRG fleet of T 3s had been reduced to 254 units however, after the Second World War numerous T 3s entered the Deutsche Bundesbahn and Deutsche Reichsbahn in East Germany, where the last examples were retired in the mid-1960s.

Deutsche Reichsbahn 
After 1945 the Deutsche Reichsbahn in the GDR inherited large numbers of T 3s from industrial and private railways as numbers 89 953, 5901–5903, 6001–6016, 6018, 6101–6132, 6134–6159, 6161, 6163, 6164, 6204–6211, 6215, 6216, 6218, 6220, 6221, 6228–6232, 6235, 6306, 7566–7568, 7571–7573 und 7578.  These included several 'genuine' Prussian T 3s.

The former 89 7535 of the Gardelegen-Neuhaldensleben-Weferlingen railway was incorporated in 1949 into the DR fleet and was given number 89 6220. This locomotive was not retired until 1967, the last T 3 in service with the DRG. The last T 3 engine on active duty, however, was the industrial engine at the Warburg Sugar Factory which retired in 1979 .

Four more examples, which came from the Oderbruchbahn, were converted by the DR in 1960 and equipped with tenders. These engines were numbered 89 6222–6225 One example, 89 6222, was initially given a four-wheeled tender, the others a Class 3 T 12 tender. One of these later replaced the four-wheeled tender as well.  The locos finished their service with the Kreisbahn Beeskow–Fürstenwalde which took them on in 1950 and withdrew them in 1968.

Deutsche Bundesbahn 
Around 70 T 3s ended up in the DB, the last one, 89 7538, being retired in 1963. However T 3s appeared briefly in the DB fleet later on. These were the industrial locomotives, nos. 2 and 3 from the Ausbesserungswerk at Schwerte, which were officially added to the DB fleet in 1968 as 089 002 and 089 003. The former locomotive 89 7531 hid behind number 089 003. It was finally retired on 21 June 1968 as the last T 3 in DB service.

Today 

Several T 3s have been preserved today by museums, some being still operational. To these belong one of the locomotives with a tender, number 89 6009 (89 7403 before its conversion), which is a DB AG museum locomotive stabled at the  Dresden Transport Museum.

Gallery

Notes

References

Further reading

Film 
 SWR: Eisenbahn-Romantik – T 3 im Angelbachtal (Folge 5)
 SWR: Eisenbahn-Romantik – T 3, kleine Loks auf großer Fahrt (Folge 199)

External links 

 The Prussian T3
 The EUROVAPOR T 3
 The T 3 with the Arbeitsgemeinschaft historische Eisenbahn

Railway locomotives introduced in 1882
T 03
0-6-0T locomotives
Standard gauge locomotives of Germany
Henschel locomotives
C n2t locomotives